Center Township is one of eleven townships in Jennings County, Indiana, United States. As of the 2010 census, its population was 8,894 and it contained 3,795 housing units.

History
Center Township was established in 1855, and was so named from its position at the geographical center of Jennings County.

Geography
The streams of Deer Creek, Long Branch, Pleasant Run and Woods Branch run through this township.

Cities and towns
 North Vernon (vast majority)

Unincorporated towns
 Oakdale

Adjacent townships
 Sand Creek Township (north)
 Campbell Township (east)
 Vernon Township (south)
 Spencer Township (west)
 Geneva Township (northwest)

Cemeteries
The township contains three cemeteries: Hill Crest, Saint Marys and Summerfield.

Major highways
  U.S. Route 50
  State Road 3
  State Road 7

Airports and landing strips
 North Vernon Airport

References
 
 United States Census Bureau cartographic boundary files

External links
 Indiana Township Association
 United Township Association of Indiana

Townships in Jennings County, Indiana
Townships in Indiana